Dmitry Yuryevich Bivol (born 18 December 1990) is a Russian professional boxer who has held the WBA light heavyweight title since 2017. As an amateur, he won a gold medal at the 2013 World Combat Games in the 81 kg weight category. As of November 2022, Bivol is ranked as the world's third best active boxer, pound for pound, by BoxRec, fifth by the Transnational Boxing Rankings Board (TBRB), sixth by The Ring, and seventh by the Boxing Writers Association of America and ESPN. He is also ranked as the best light heavyweight by The Ring, ESPN, and BoxRec, and second by TBRB.

Early life
Dmitry Bivol's father was born in Soviet Moldova while his mother is an ethnic Korean born in Kazakhstan. Dmitry's parents moved to Soviet Kyrgyzstan after graduating and marrying. Dmitry was born and raised in Kyrgyzstan until the age of 11, when he moved to Saint Petersburg, Russia.

Amateur career
Dmitry Bivol took up boxing at the age of 6 in Tokmak, Kyrgyzstan. Bivol was a naturally bigger kid and he weighed a lot compared to an average-size boy of his age. He explains how his confidence grew as he started to win over much older guys in his amateur bouts. Bivol was a decorated amateur, winning 2 world championships at the junior (U-17) level, as well as a bronze medal at the 2008 AIBA Youth World Boxing Championships in the middleweight division. Bivol won the Russian national amateur boxing championships in 2012 and 2014, as a light heavyweight. His record as an amateur is 268–15.

Professional career

Early career
Bivol made his professional debut in November 2014. He won his first 6 fights by knockout. Bivol sparred with Egor Mekhontsev, Jean Pascal, and Vyacheslav Shabranskyy early in his career. Bivol lives in St. Petersburg but trains in Southern California.

WBA interim light heavyweight champion
Bivol won the interim WBA light heavyweight title on 21 May 2016, beating previously undefeated Felix Valera by unanimous decision (119-107, 119-107, 116-111). Bivol dominated Valera, dropping him twice with combinations. At the time, the WBA had three different world titles, with Bivol holding the lesser version of them. Bivol's first defense came against Robert Berridge on 23 February 2017. Bivol easily overcame Berridge, pummeling him over 4 rounds before a technical knockout stoppage. Berridge was knocked down in round 3. At the start of round 4, Bivol opened a cut over Berridge's right eye. Following another knockdown and with Berridge bleeding profusely, the ringside doctor stopped the fight. Bivol then defended his title against Samuel Clarkson on 14 April 2017. The fight headlined a ShoBox show at the MGM National Harbor in Maryland. Bivol once again won in dominant fashion, knocking Clarkson down twice in the first round, before dropping him once more with a short right hand midway through round 4. Although Clarkson got up, the referee stopped the fight, giving Bivol a TKO win.

Bivol sought to face WBA (Regular) champion Nathan Cleverly following his win over Clarkson. He appeared on the undercard of Ward-Kovalev II, in a non-title bout against Cedric Agnew. Agnew had previously lost to Clarkson. Bivol once again won quickly and emphatically, getting a 4th-round TKO for the third consecutive time. Agnew was dropped in the first round.

WBA light heavyweight champion
As interim champion, Bivol was Cleverly's mandatory challenger, but the WBA granted Cleverly an exception for him to face Badou Jack. After Jack defeated Cleverly, the WBA ordered a Jack-Bivol purse bid. However, following WBA (Super) and unified champion Andre Ward's retirement, Jack decided to vacate his title, presumably to pursue one of the other vacant titles previously held by Ward.

Bivol vs. Broadhurst
With the WBA's other two titles being vacated, interim champion Bivol was elevated to full champion. He was scheduled to fight Trent Broadhurst on an optional defense on 4 November 2017 at the Salle des Etoiles. As interim champion, Dmitry Bivol was ranked #1 by the WBA when the fight was announced, while Broadhurst was ranked #11. The announcement was met with incredulity by the media, due to many fighters ranked above Broadhurst being available. The WBA's #2 contender, Sullivan Barrera, took to Twitter to express his displeasure at being overlooked. The WBA's president, Gilberto Mendoza, later clarified that the winner of the bout will be ordered to fight the WBA's top contender within 120 days. Bivol won the fight by knockout with a clean right-handed shot at the end of the first round. The live broadcast of the fight averaged 341,000 viewers on HBO, while a same-day replay averaged 289,000 viewers.

Bivol vs. Barrera
Next Bivol faced the toughest test of his career on 3 March 2018 and dominated Sullivan Barrera (21-2, 14 KO) and stopped him in the 12th and final round. Bivol was able to outbox and out-punch Barrera throughout the fight, then exploded suddenly with a massive right hand that put the Cuban down halfway into the final frame. Barrera did get up, but referee Harvey Dock stopped the fight for the TKO at 1:41. Bivol received a cut over his right eye early in the bout, and a haematoma that developed over his left eye as the fight went on. Both came from accidental clashes of heads. The fight was part of a doubleheader which saw Sergey Kovalev successfully defend his WBO title against Igor Mikhalkin. The card was confirmed in December 2017. After the fight, Bivol said through a translator, “I felt a little bit like an amateur tonight, it was a really great opponent. Barrera showed me a lot of things tonight, and I have to work on a lot of things. Thanks, Sullivan. I was a little bit reserved. I was thinking how much I need to go the rest of the fight, but in the 12th round, I knew I could knock him out. I stepped on the gas, and the knockout came.”

Bivol landed 244 of 778 (31%) of his punches, including 146 of 378 (39%) power shots, compared to just 75 of 606 (12%) for Barrera, who landed 65 of 273 (24%) of his power punches. Barrera, who has a solid jab, was also completely out-jabbed, landing just 10 of 333 (3%), compared to 97 of 400 (24%) for Bivol. The fight averaged 512,000 viewers, peaking at 570,000 viewers, on HBO.

Bivol vs. Chilemba
On 6 June 2018, Main Events announced that Bivol would make a defence against 31-year-old, longtime contender Isaac Chilemba (25-5-2, 10 KOs) on 4 August at the Etess Arena in Atlantic City, New Jersey. Bivol was happy he had the chance to fight a tough challenger, "I am glad that my next opponent will be a tough and well-known boxer in Chilemba. I will do my best to put on another exciting performance for all my fans." The fight would be a co-feature to Sergey Kovalev defending his WBO title against Eleider Álvarez. The idea of having both Bivol and Kovalev on the same card was part of a plan to have them face off in the fall of 2018 in a unification bout, however both had to come out victorious in their respected bouts.

In front of a sold-out crowd of 5,642, Bivol handed Chilemba his sixth career defeat by defeating him via a twelve-round unanimous decision, retaining his WBA title. The three judges scored the bout 120–108, 120–108, and 116–112 for Bivol. Other media outlets including ESPN also scored it a shutout win for Bivol. Bivol landed the harder and cleaner shots throughout the fight. Chilemba landed some nice punches, but not enough to take the rounds. Chilemba used his size to his advantage. Bivol appeared to hurt his right hand as he hardly used it after the first six rounds. Bivol appeared to have hurt his right hand early on. To many viewers, Bivol's right hand gave him a bit of aching after the early rounds. Chilemba showed a great chin in absorbing Bivol's best punches in the first six rounds. Bivol displayed his defensive skills as he blocked many of Chilemba's punches. The punch Chilemba landed the most was a jab. After the fight, Bivol said, "Chilemba is a good fighter and he had champion spirit tonight. He is a strong fighter. I want to fight more good fighters. I don't know who my next opponent will be." Bivol described Chilemba as an awkward fighter. Chilemba believed he dominated the fight after round 6 and should have won the fight. According to CompuBox, Bivol landed 154 of 447 punches thrown (35%) and Chilemba landed 73 of his 472 thrown (16%). The fight, which took place on HBO, averaged 583,000 viewers and hit a peak of 632,000 viewers.

In the main event, Álvarez knocked out Kovalev to claim the WBO title, putting a dent in Bivol's plan to fight Kovalev in the fall.

Bivol vs. Pascal
Weeks after defeating Chilemba, Bivol's manager, Vadim Kornilov, revealed Bivol would likely return to the ring in December 2018. With the other light heavyweight titleholders already scheduled to make defences, Kornilov stated, "We're trying to get the biggest name we can to get Dmitry more exposure fighting top guys." In September, there were rumours circulating that Bivol would defend his title against Joe Smith Jr. in December. A month later, TVA Sports and The Montreal Journal reported that former unified champion Jean Pascal (33-5-1, 20 KOs) was in talks to fight Bivol on 24 November 2018. The news came after it was also reported that Smith was reportedly closing in on signing a deal to fight IBF champion Artur Beterbiev in December. Pascal was one of the frontrunners to fight Bivol in August 2018. Only a few hours later, the fight was announced to take place on HBO at the Etess Arena in Atlantic City. Before talks emerged, Pascal was originally scheduled to fight Canadian cruiserweight champion Gary Kopas in Canada on 9 November, however the fight was cancelled in early October after Pascal needed time to attend his father's funeral.

Bivol vs. Smith Jr.
On 9 March 2019, Bivol outboxed Joe Smith Jr. to win a unanimous decision at the Turning Stone Resort Casino, Verona, New York, with scores of 119-109, 119-109, 118-110. Bivol's complete domination was reflected by the CompuBox punch stats: Bivol out-threw Smith Jr. 714 to 395, while Bivol outlanded him by a lopsided margin of 208 to 39, for a 29% to 10% edge in accuracy.

WBA (Super) light heavyweight champion

Bivol vs. Castillo
On 10 October 2019, Bivol was elevated to the status of full WBA (Super) light heavyweight champion, two days before his fight against Gilbert Lenin Castillo. On 12 October 2019, Bivol fought Gilbert Lenin Castillo on the undercard of Oleksandr Usyk vs. Chazz Witherspoon at the Wintrust Arena, Chicago. Bivol dropped his opponent in the sixth round with a counter right hand en route to a convincing unanimous decision victory, with scores of 119-108, 119-108, and 120-107. According to CompuBox, Bivol landed 188 of 652 total punches, connecting at a 29% rate, compared to Castillo, who was 98 of 429 (23%).

Bivol vs. Richards
On 19 February 2021, it was revealed that Bivol would make the second defense of his WBA (Super) title against the #8 ranked WBA light heavyweight contender Craig Richards. The bout was scheduled for the undercard of the Dereck Chisora and Joseph Parker heavyweight clash, which took place on 1 May 2021, at the Manchester Arena. Bivol came into his first title defense as a significant -3300 favorite, while most odds-makers had Richards as a +1400 underdog. He justified his role as the betting favorite, winning the fight by unanimous decision, with scores of 118–110, 115–113 and 115–114. Bivol appeared to take the first eight rounds, while Richard managed to edge out the last four rounds of the fight. Bivol called out his fellow light heavyweight champions for a title unification bout in the post-fight interview, stating: "It doesn’t matter who wants to fight me, I’m open for everyone from the light heavyweight division".

Bivol vs. Salamov
On 22 November 2021, it was announced that Bivol would make his third WBA (Super) light heavyweight title defense against Umar Salamov on 11 December 2021, at the KRK Uralets in Ekaterinburg, Russia. The title bout was scheduled as the main event of a DAZN broadcast card. Salamov was initially expected to face the WBO titleholder Joe Smith Jr. in October 2021, before the fight was cancelled as Smith Jr. withdrew after contracting COVID-19. Bivol entered the fight as a -2000 favorite to win, while most odds-makers had Salamov as a +1100 underdog. Bivol retained the title by a dominant unanimous decision, with two judges scoring the fight 118–110 in his favor, while the third judge awarded him a 119–109 scorecard.

Bivol vs. Álvarez

It was announced on 25 February 2022 that Bivol would be making the fourth defense of his WBA (Super) title against 4-division world champion Canelo Álvarez on 7 May in a bout that would be televised as sports streaming service DAZN's first pay-per-view offering in the United States and Canada. The fight was able to take place because while in response to the 2022 Russian invasion of Ukraine three of boxing's world governing bodies had blocked championship fights involving Russian and Belarusian boxers, the World Boxing Association (WBA) chose to allow the fight to proceed. Despite coming into the bout as an underdog, with most odds-makers having him a +400 underdog, Bivol won the fight by unanimous decision (115–113 on all three judges' scorecards) after 12 rounds. According to CompuBox punch statistics, Bivol had outlanded Álvarez in every single round of the fight, for a total of 152 punches landed out of 710 thrown (21%), compared to Álvarez's 84 of 495 (17%). Many media reporters and pundits drew attention to the judges' official scorecards: all three judges had scored Álvarez the winner of the first four rounds, something that was roundly criticized, and described by ESPN reporter Mike Coppinger as "puzzling". Despite the widespread public opinion that Bivol was the deserved winner, Álvarez disagreed with this notion, stating in his post-fight interview: "I don't feel like I lost the fight... Personally, I felt he [Bivol] only won four or five rounds." He went on to express his desire to fight Bivol again: "We want the rematch, and we're going to do better in the rematch."

Bivol vs. Ramírez
On 11 July 2022, the WBA ordered Bivol to make a mandatory title defense against the former WBO super middleweight champion and current top contender Gilberto Ramírez. His promoters, Matchroom Boxing, asked for an exemption to bypass a mandatory title defense against Ramirez and instead face Joshua Buatsi. The request was rejected by the WBA on 10 August. A purse bid was called for 21 August as the pair failed to come to terms, with a minimum bid of $400,000, with a 75% split in favor of Bivol. The two camps came to an agreement on 21 August. Bivol and Ramírez would face each other on 5 November 2022, in the United Arab Emirates. Bivol won the fight by unanimous decision, with scores of 117–111, 117–111 and 118–110. Bivol outlanded Ramirez 131 to 107 in overall punches and 64 to 38 in jabs, negating his opponent's narrow 69 to 67 lead in power connects. During the post-fight interview, Bivol stated his desire to face the unified light heavyweight champion Artur Beterbiev in a title unification bout. He was later named the 2022 The Ring "Fighter of the Year".

Professional boxing record

Pay-per-view bouts

Professional boxing

References

External links

Dmitry Bivol Partial Record from Amateur Boxing Results

1990 births
Living people
Russian male boxers
Russian people of Moldovan descent
Russian people of Korean descent
Koryo-saram
World Boxing Association champions
World light-heavyweight boxing champions
Universiade silver medalists for Russia
Universiade medalists in boxing
Medalists at the 2013 Summer Universiade